The men's 200 metre breaststroke event at the 2018 Commonwealth Games was held on 5 April at the Gold Coast Aquatic Centre.

Records
Prior to this competition, the existing world, Commonwealth and Games records were as follows:

Schedule
The schedule is as follows:

All times are Australian Eastern Standard Time (UTC+10)

Results

Heats

Final

References

Men's 200 metre breaststroke
Commonwealth Games